Antonio Damasio is a Portuguese-American neuroscientist. He is currently the David Dornsife Chair in Neuroscience, as well as Professor of Psychology, Philosophy, and Neurology, at the University of Southern California, and, additionally, an adjunct professor at the Salk Institute. He was previously the chair of neurology at the University of Iowa for 20 years. Damasio heads the Brain and Creativity Institute, and has authored several books: his work, Self Comes to Mind: Constructing the Conscious Brain (2010), explores the relationship between the brain and consciousness. Damasio's research in neuroscience has shown that emotions play a central role in social cognition and decision-making.

Life and work 

During the 1960s, Damasio studied medicine at the University of Lisbon Medical School, where he also did his neurological residency and completed his doctorate in 1974. For part of his studies, he researched behavioral neurology under the supervision of Norman Geschwind of the Aphasia Research Center in Boston.

Damasio's main field is neurobiology, especially the neural systems which underlie emotion, decision-making, memory, language and consciousness. Damasio might believe that emotions play a critical role in high-level cognition—an idea counter to dominant 20th-century views in psychology, neuroscience and philosophy.

Damasio formulated the somatic marker hypothesis, a theory about how emotions and their biological underpinnings are involved in decision-making (both positively and negatively, and often non-consciously). Emotions provide the scaffolding for the construction of social cognition and are required for the self processes which undergird consciousness. "Damasio provides a contemporary scientific validation of the linkage between feelings and the body by highlighting the connection between mind and nerve cells ... this personalized embodiment of mind."

The somatic marker hypothesis has inspired many neuroscience experiments carried out in laboratories in the U.S. and Europe, and has had a major impact in contemporary science and philosophy. Damasio has been named by the Institute for Scientific Information as one of the most highly cited researchers in the past decade. Current work on the biology of moral decisions, neuro-economics, social communication, and drug-addiction, has been strongly influenced by Damasio's hypothesis. An article published in the Archives of Scientific Psychology in 2014 named Damasio one of the 100 most eminent psychologist of the modern era. (Diener et al. Archives of Scientific Psychology, 2014, 2, 20–32). The June–July issue of Sciences Humaines included Damasio in its list of 50 key thinkers in the human sciences of the past two centuries.

Damasio also proposed that emotions are part of homeostatic regulation and are rooted in reward/punishment mechanisms. He recovered William James' perspective on feelings as a read-out of body states, but expanded it with an "as-if-body-loop" device which allows for the substrate of feelings to be simulated rather than actual (foreshadowing the simulation process later uncovered by mirror neurons). He demonstrated experimentally that the insular cortex is a critical platform for feelings, a finding that has been widely replicated, and he uncovered cortical and subcortical induction sites for human emotions, e.g. in ventromedial prefrontal cortex and amygdala. He also demonstrated that while the insular cortex plays a major role in feelings, it is not necessary for feelings to occur, suggesting that brain stem structures play a basic role in the feeling process.

He has continued to investigate the neural basis of feelings and demonstrated that although the insular cortex is a major substrate for this process it is not exclusive, suggesting that brain stem nuclei are critical platforms as well. He regards feelings as the necessary foundation of sentience.

In another development, Damasio proposed that the cortical architecture on which learning and recall depend involves multiple, hierarchically organized loops of axonal projections that converge on certain nodes out of which projections diverge to the points of origin of convergence (the convergence-divergence zones). This architecture is applicable to the understanding of memory processes and of aspects of consciousness related to the access of mental contents.

In The Feeling of What Happens, Damasio laid the foundations of the "enchainment of precedences": "the nonconscious neural signaling of an individual organism begets the protoself which permits core self and core consciousness, which allow for an autobiographical self, which permits extended consciousness. At the end of the chain, extended consciousness permits conscience.

Damasio's research depended significantly on establishing the modern human lesion method, an enterprise made possible by Hanna Damasio's structural neuroimaging/neuroanatomy work complemented by experimental neuroanatomy (with Gary Van Hoesen and Josef Parvizi), experimental neuropsychology (with Antoine Bechara, Ralph Adolphs, and Dan Tranel) and functional neuroimaging (with Kaspar Meyer, Jonas Kaplan, and Mary Helen Immordino-Yang). The experimental neuroanatomy work with Van Hoesen and Bradley Hyman led to the discovery of the disconnection of the hippocampus caused by neurofibrillary tangles in the entorhinal cortex of patients with Alzheimer's disease.

As a clinician, he and his collaborators have studied and treated disorders of behaviour and cognition, and movement disorders.

Damasio's books deal with the relationship between emotions and their brain substrates. His 1994 book, Descartes' Error: Emotion, Reason and the Human Brain, won the Science et Vie prize, was a finalist for the Los Angeles Times Book Award, and is translated in over 30 languages. It is regarded as one of the most influential books of the past two decades. His second book, The Feeling of What Happens: Body and Emotion in the Making of Consciousness, was named as one of the ten best books of 2001 by the New York Times Book Review, a Publishers Weekly Best Book of the Year, a Library Journal Best Book of the Year, and has over 30 foreign editions. On the basis of a single-case experiment, Damasio suggested emotions belong to the automatic vital processes of the body and thus can be recognized by a person without any form of memory.
In 2003, this work was followed by the publication of Looking for Spinoza: Joy, Sorrow, and the Feeling Brain. In it, Damasio suggested that the philosopher Baruch Spinoza's thinking foreshadowed discoveries in biology and neuroscience views on the mind-body problem and that Spinoza was a protobiologist. Damasio's book is Self Comes to Mind: Constructing the Conscious Brain. In it Damasio suggests that the self is the key to conscious minds and that feelings, from the kind he designates as primordial to the well-known feelings of emotion, are the basic elements in the construction of the protoself and core self. The book received the Corinne International Book Prize.

Damasio is a member of the American Academy of Arts and Sciences, the National Academy of Medicine, the European Academy of Sciences and Arts. He is the recipient of several prizes, amongst them the Grawemeyer Award, the Honda Prize, the Prince of Asturias Award in Science and Technology and the Beaumont Medal from the American Medical Association, as well as honorary degrees from, most recently, the Sorbonne (Université Paris Descartes), shared with his wife Hanna Damasio. He has also received doctorates from the Universities of Aachen, Copenhagen, Leiden, Barcelona, Coimbra, Leuven and numerous others.

In 2013, the Escola Secundária António Damásio was dedicated in Lisbon.

He says he writes in the belief that "scientific knowledge can be a pillar to help humans endure and prevail."

He is married to Hanna Damasio, a prominent neuroscientist and frequent collaborator and co-author, who is a professor of neuroscience at the University of Southern California and the director of the Dornsife Neuroimaging Center.

In 2017 he was designated member of the Council of State of Portugal, replacing Antonio Guterres, the 9th Secretary-General of the United Nations.

Damasio additionally serves on the board of directors of the Berggruen Institute, and sits on the jury for the Berggruen Prize for Philosophy.

Selected bibliography

Books 
Descartes' Error: Emotion, Reason, and the Human Brain, Putnam, 1994; revised Penguin edition, 2005
The Feeling of What Happens: Body and Emotion in the Making of Consciousness, Harcourt, 1999
Looking for Spinoza: Joy, Sorrow, and the Feeling Brain, Harcourt, 2003
Self Comes to Mind: Constructing the Conscious Brain, Pantheon, 2010. 
The Strange Order of Things: Life, Feeling, and the Making of Cultures, Pantheon, 2018.
Feeling and Knowing: Making Minds Conscious, Pantheon, 2021

Selected articles

See also

References

External links 

 USC Faculty page
 Brain and Creativity Institute
 
 Antonio Damasio: The quest to understand consciousness (TED2011)

 Audio of António Damasio 2003 lecture, "Emotion, Feeling, and Social Behavior: The Brain Perspective" at Walter Chapin Simpson Center for the Humanities
 Ideas of António Damasio – JRSM book review
 

1944 births
American people of Portuguese descent
Cognitive neuroscientists
Consciousness researchers and theorists
Descartes scholars
Fellows of the American Academy of Arts and Sciences
Living people
Members of the European Academy of Sciences and Arts
Neuropsychologists
People from Lisbon
Pessoa Prize winners
Philosophers of mind
Philosophers of science
Portuguese neuroscientists
Portuguese scientists
Science writers
Spinoza scholars
Spinozists
University of Iowa faculty
University of Lisbon alumni
University of Southern California faculty
Members of the National Academy of Medicine